The discography of American singer, songwriter, musician, record producer, actor and parodist "Weird Al" Yankovic consists of fourteen studio albums, one soundtrack album, nine compilation albums, eleven video albums, two extended plays, two box sets, forty-six singles and fifty-four music videos. Since the debut of his first comedy song in 1976, he has sold more than 12 million albums—more than any other comedy act in history—recorded more than 150 parody and original songs, and performed more than 1,000 live shows. His works have earned him five Grammy Awards among sixteen nominations, along with several gold and platinum record certifications in the United States. Yankovic's first single, "My Bologna", was released in 1979, and he made his chart debut two years later with his second single, "Another One Rides the Bus", which peaked at number four on the Billboard Bubbling Under Hot 100 Singles chart. His self-titled debut studio album was released on Scotti Brothers Records in April 1983, peaking at number 16 on the US Billboard 200 and being certified gold by the Recording Industry Association of America (RIAA). "Ricky", the album's third single, became his first single to chart on the US Billboard Hot 100, peaking at number 64.

"Weird Al" Yankovic in 3-D followed in February 1984. It peaked at number 17 on the Billboard 200 and was certified platinum by the RIAA, while also charting in Australia and Canada. The album's lead single "Eat It" was a commercial success, topping the Australian singles chart and also reaching the top 15 in Canada and the United States. Follow-up singles "King of Suede" and "I Lost on Jeopardy" peaked at numbers 62 and 81 respectively on the Hot 100. Yankovic's third studio album, Dare to Be Stupid, was released in June 1985, peaked at number 17 on the Billboard 200, and produced six singles, the most successful being the Hot 100 hit "Like a Surgeon". Issued in October 1986, his fourth studio album Polka Party! charted at a disappointing number 177 on the Billboard 200, with the album and its accompanying singles failing to match the commercial success of Yankovic's previous work. His fifth studio album, released in April 1988, Even Worse, fared better commercially, peaking at number 27 on the Billboard 200 and earning him a minor chart hit with the single "Fat". Released later in October 1988 was Peter and the Wolf, a collaboration with American composer Wendy Carlos.

In 1989, Yankovic starred in and recorded the soundtrack for the 1989 film UHF. The soundtrack album was released in July 1989, charting at number 146 on the Billboard 200. Released in April 1992, Yankovic's seventh studio album Off the Deep End helped revitalize his career after a decline in commercial success in the late 1980s, peaking at number 17 on the Billboard 200, earning a platinum certification from the RIAA, and producing the Billboard top 40 hit "Smells Like Nirvana". Alapalooza, his eighth studio album, was released in October 1993; it peaked at number 46 on the Billboard 200. Bad Hair Day, Yankovic's ninth studio album was released in April 1996, peaked at numbers 9 and 14 respectively on the Canadian Albums Chart and Billboard 200. "Amish Paradise", the album's lead single, peaked at number 53 on the Billboard Hot 100.

After signing to new label Volcano Records, Yankovic released his tenth studio album Running with Scissors in June 1999. The album peaked at number 16 on the Billboard 200 and produced a minor Australian chart hit, "Pretty Fly for a Rabbi". Poodle Hat, his eleventh studio album, was released in May 2003 and peaked at number 17 on the Billboard 200. Straight Outta Lynwood was released in September 2006 and peaked at number 10 on the Billboard 200, becoming Yankovic's first top ten album on the chart. He also scored his first top ten hit on the Billboard Hot 100 with the album's lead single "White & Nerdy". Alpocalypse was released in June 2011 and peaked at number nine on the Billboard 200, and Mandatory Fun followed in July 2014. The latter became Yankovic's first number-one album on the chart, with first-week sales of 104,000 copies.

Since 1991, when Nielsen started tracking sales, Yankovic has sold 10.3 million albums in United States as of December 2019.

Albums

Studio albums

Collaborative albums

Soundtrack albums

Compilation albums

Video releases

Box sets

Extended plays

Singles

Other charted songs
The following songs charted in the US, despite not having been released as official singles:

Guest appearances

Music videos

See also
 List of songs by "Weird Al" Yankovic

Explanatory notes

References

Bibliography

Citations

External links
 
 "Weird Al" Yankovic at AllMusic
 
 

Comedian discographies
Discographies of American artists
Discography